Diporiphora jugularis, the black-throated two-pored dragon, is a species of agama found in Australia and Papua New Guinea.

References

Diporiphora
Agamid lizards of Australia
Taxa named by William John Macleay
Reptiles described in 1877